The Government General Degree College at Manbazar-II, Purulia is the first and, so far, the only government general degree college of the Purulia district.  Its journey began from the year 2015 under the purview of the Director of Public Instruction, Higher Education Department, Government of West Bengal. The college is affiliated to the Sidho Kanho Birsa University, Purulia and offers several Under Graduate courses.

How to reach: 

Situated at the village Susunia (PO: Kumari, PS: Boro, Pin-723131) the college stands just by the road that connects Manbazar and Bandwan. It can be reached by buses that run from Purulia, Bankura, Manbazar, Bandwan, Jhargram or even as far as from Medinipur.

Departments

Arts
Bengali 
English
History
Santali
Philosophy
Political Science

Science
Physics
Chemistry
Mathematics
Geology

Courses offered:

The college so far offers Core Courses (honours) on Bengali, English, Santali, History, Philosophy, Political Science, Geology and Mathematics. It also offers Program/regular Courses (general) on Arts and Science subjects under Sidho Kanho Birsa University, Purulia.

See also

References

External links
 http://govtcollegemanbazar2purulia.ac.in/collegeprofile.php#profile
Sidho Kanho Birsha University
University Grants Commission
National Assessment and Accreditation Council

Universities and colleges in Purulia district
Colleges affiliated to Sidho Kanho Birsha University
Educational institutions established in 2014
2014 establishments in West Bengal